Hippolyte Gevaert or Fierens-Gevaert (1870, Brussels - 1926, Liège) was a Belgian art historian, philosopher, art critic, singer and writer.

Life
He had studied at the Conservatoire royal de Bruxelles in 1890 and won first prize for singing. That same year he married Jacqueline Marthe Gevaert, daughter of the musician François-Auguste Gevaert (1828-1908). He then joined the Opéra de Lille, but an accident with his voice ended his singing career. He moved to Paris, where he began working as a journalist, writer and art critic and changed his surname to Fierens-Gevaert.

He later became the first curator of the Royal Museums of Fine Arts of Belgium and was also a professor of aesthetics and art history.

Works 
 Essai sur l’art contemporain, Paris : Alcan, 1897
 La tristesse contemporaine, Paris : Alcan, 1899
 Psychologie d’une ville, essai sur Bruges, Paris : Alcan, 1901
 L'Hôtel de ville de Paris, Paris : Librairie de l'art ancien et moderne, 1902
 Van Dyck, Paris : H. Laurens, 1903
 Nouveaux essays sur l’art contemporain, Paris : Alcan, 1903
 Jordaens : biographie critique, Paris : H. Laurens, 1905
 Études sur l'art flamand, La Renaissance septentrionale et les premiers maîtres des Flandres, Brussels : G. van Oest, 1905
 L’Art au XXe siècle et son expression en Belgique, Brussels : Éditions de la Belgique, 1907
 La peinture en Belgique, musées, églises, collections, etc/ Les Primitifs Flamands, 2 vols/, Brussels : G. van Oest, 1908-1909
 La peinture au Musée ancien de Bruxelles, Brussels : G. van Oest, 1913 
 L'enseignement de l'histoire de l'art en Belgique, Revue de Synthèse historique 28, 82 (1914) : 82-90, 
 Les Très Belles Heures de Jean de France, duc de Berry, Brussels : Weckesser, 1924 [and Fierens, Paul : 3rd vol.] 
 Histoire de la peinture flamande des origines à la fin du XVe siècle, 3 vols, Brussels : G. van Oest, 1927-1929

References

Writers from Brussels
1870 births
1926 deaths
Belgian art historians
20th-century Belgian philosophers
Belgian art critics
20th-century Belgian male singers
20th-century Belgian singers
Royal Conservatory of Brussels alumni
19th-century Belgian male singers